This list of ship launches in the 1600s includes a chronological list of some ships launched from 1600 to 1609.

References 

1600s ships
1600